The II Corps was a corps of the Army of the Republic of Vietnam (ARVN), the army of the nation state of South Vietnam that existed from 1955 to 1975. It was one of four corps in the ARVN, and it oversaw the central highlands region, north of the capital Saigon. Its corps headquarters was in the mountain town of Pleiku.

II Corps became operational in April 1958.

One notable ARVN unit of II Corps, the 3d Armored Cavalry Squadron, earned the Presidential Unit Citation (United States).

The 21st Tank Regiment was formed at Pleiku in 1972.

1972 Easter Offensive 

The objective of the North Vietnamese forces during the third phase of the Nguyen Hue Offensive was to seize the cities of Kon Tum and Pleiku, thereby overrunning the Central Highlands. This would then open the possibility of proceeding east to the coastal plains, splitting South Vietnam in two. The highlands offensive was preceded by NLF diversionary operations that opened on 5 April in coastal Bình Định Province, which aimed at closing Highway 1, seizing several ARVN firebases, and diverting South Vietnamese forces from operations further west. The North Vietnamese were under the command of Lieutenant General Hoang Minh Thao, commander of the B-3 Front. The Front included the 320th and 2nd PAVN Divisions in the highlands and the 3rd PAVN Division in the lowlands – approximately 50,000 men.

Arrayed against them in II Corps were the South Vietnamese 22nd and 23rd Divisions, two armored cavalry squadrons, and the 2nd Airborne Brigade, all under the command of Lieutenant General Ngo Du. It had become evident as early as January that the North Vietnamese were building up for offensive operations in the tri-border region and numerous B-52 strikes had been conducted in the area in hopes of slowing the build-up. ARVN forces had also been deployed forward toward the border in order to slow the PAVN advance and allow the application of airpower to deplete North Vietnamese manpower and logistics. The Bình Định offensive, however, threw General Du into a panic and almost convinced him to fall for the North Vietnamese ploy and divert his forces from the highlands.

Divisions

References 
 

Corps level formations of South Vietnam
Military units and formations established in the 1960s
Military units and formations disestablished in 1975